The veteran poacher (Podothecus veternus) is a fish in the family Agonidae. It was described by David Starr Jordan and Edwin Chapin Starks in 1895. It is a marine, polar water-dwelling fish which is known from the northwestern Pacific Ocean, including Peter the Great Bay; Robben Island, Sakhalin; and the Sea of Okhotsk. It dwells at a depth range .

References

Veteran poacher
Fish described in 1895